Second S. Nijalingappa Ministry was the Council of Ministers in Mysore, a state in South India headed by S. Nijalingappa of the Indian National Congress.

The ministry had multiple  ministers including the Chief Minister of Mysore. All ministers belonged to the Indian National Congress.

S. Nijalingappa became Chief minister of Mysore after Indian National Congress emerged victorious 1957 Mysore elections.

Chief Minister & Cabinet Ministers

Minister of State / Deputy Ministers

See also 
 Mysore Legislative Assembly
 Mysore Legislative Council
 Politics of Mysore

References 

Cabinets established in 1957
1957 establishments in Mysore State
1957 in Indian politics
1958 disestablishments in India
Nijalingappa
Indian National Congress state ministries
Cabinets disestablished in 1958